The 2014 Vo Vietnam World cup were the 4nd edition of the Vovinam VietVoDao World Cup, and were held in Paris, France from 24 to 26 July 2014.

Medal summary

Medal table

References

2014 in French sport
2014 in martial arts
Sports competitions in Paris